Loxford School (formerly Loxford School of Science and Technology) is a mixed all-through school with academy status located in the Ilford area of the London Borough of Redbridge, England. The school's current headteacher is Anita Johnson. The secondary school now has more than 3000 students aged from 11 to 18 years, and a primary school is connected to it. The school is a part of the Loxford School Trust which consists of 6 other academies.

Students
Most students attending the secondary school are from a primary school in the local Ilford area, such as Woodlands Primary School, Cleveland Primary School or Uphall Primary School. The secondary school students also consist of former Loxford primary students as they are guaranteed a place automatically.

Criticism
In February 2010, Loxford gained attention due to the anti-semitic views of some of the school's Muslim students. A student whose name has been left undisclosed was probed by the police for creating a Facebook group in order for them and their friends to express their hatred of Jewish people. This Facebook group gained over 500 members in two weeks and discussions in the group included accounts of the students engaging in anti-semitic behaviour, including assault. Commenters to the Facebook group frequently mentioned jihad and used Quranic justifications for their beliefs.

In May 2019, after a picture depicting children of the school praying outside circulated online, the school was criticised for not having proper faith spaces for the children to pray in. The school is in the London Borough of Redbridge which consists of a large Muslim community.

Notable former pupils 
 Nigel Benn (born 1964), former professional boxer
 Charlie Cawood (born 1988), multi-instrumental musician and composer

References

External links 
 School Website

Secondary schools in the London Borough of Redbridge
Primary schools in the London Borough of Redbridge
Academies in the London Borough of Redbridge
Ilford